The Canada Social Transfer (CST) is the Canadian government's transfer payment program in support of post-secondary education, social assistance, and social services, including early childhood development and early learning and childcare. It was made independent from the Canada Health and Social Transfer program on 1 April 2004 to allow for greater accountability and transparency for federal health funding.  In 2008/2009, the program transferred $10.6 billion in cash to the provinces and a further $8.5 billion in tax points.

The program was originally combined with the Canada Health Transfer in a program called the Canada Health and Social Transfer.

See also
 Education in Canada

References

External links
 Department of Finance Canada - Description of Canada Social Transfer program

Federal departments and agencies of Canada
Government finances in Canada
Higher education in Canada
Welfare in Canada